This is a list of banks in Kuwait. All the following local (11 nos.) & foreign (11 nos.) banks are registered with Kuwait Banking Association.  The Central Bank of Kuwait supervises the 32 Exchange Companies that operate within Kuwait.

Central Bank 
 Central Bank of Kuwait (CBK)

Credit Bank 
 Kuwait Credit Bank (KCB)

Local Banks

Conventional Banks 
 National Bank of Kuwait (K.S.C) (NBK)
 Commercial Bank of Kuwait (K.S.C)(Al-Tijari CBK)
 Gulf Bank (K.S.C) (GBK)
 Al Ahli Bank of Kuwait (K.S.C.P.) (ABK)
 Burgan Bank (K.S.C) (Burgan)

Islamic Banks 
 Al Ahli United Bank (AUB)
 Kuwait International Bank (K.S.C) (KIB)
 Kuwait Finance House (KFH)
 Boubyan Bank (K.S.C) (Boubyan)
 Warba Bank (Warba)

Specialized Bank 
 The Industrial Bank of Kuwait (K.S.C) (IBK)

Foreign Banks 
 Bank of Bahrain and Kuwait (B.S.C) (BBK)
 Banque Nationale de Paris (BNP) and Paribas
 HongKong and Shanghai Banking Corporation Bank Middle East Limited (HSBC Middle East)
 First Abu Dhabi Bank (FAB Kuwait)
 Citibank N.A. Kuwait (Subsidiary of Citibank Europe, Middle East & Africa)
 Qatar National Bank (Q.P.S.C) (QNB)
 Doha Bank (Doha)
 Mashreq Bank P.S.C (Mashreq)
 Al Rajhi Banking & Investment Corporation (Rajhi)
 Bank Muscat
 Industrial and Commercial Bank of China Limited (ICBC)

Exchange Companies 
 Zajil Exchange Company
 Al-Nada International Exchange Company
 Kuwait India International Exchange Company
 City International Exchange Company
 Al-Muzaini Exchange Company
 Al-Zamel Exchange Company
 National Money Exchange Company
 Oman Exchange Company
 United Arab Emirates (UAE) Exchange Center
 Kuwait Bahrain International Exchange Company
 Bahrain Exchange Company
 Al-Ektisad United Company Ltd.
 Sulaiman Ali Al Makhazem Exchange Company
 Atlas Exchange Company
 United Gulf Exchange Company
 Al-Mulla International Exchange Company
 National Exchange Company
 Lulu Exchange Company W.L.L.
 Yousef & Esra Exchange Company W.L.L.
 Al-Ansari Exchange Company
 Al-Malik Al-Dhary Exchange Company
 Al-Safaa Al-Alamiah Exchange Company
 Joyalukkas Exchange Company W.L.L.
 Money Basket International Exchange Company
 Wall Street Exchange Company (Mohammed Mostafa Abazaid And His partner LLC)
 Kuwait Asian International Exchange Company
 ARY Exchange Company
 Al-Tawoos International Exchange Company
 Al-Sultan Exchange Company
 Aman Exchange Company W.L.L.
 Riyal Exchange Company
 U J Exchange Company

See also 
 List of banks in the Arab world

References

Kuwait
Kuwait
Kuwait
Banks